Club de Fútbol Jacetano is a football team based in Jaca in the autonomous community of Aragón.

Founded in 1960, it plays in the Regional Preferente. Its stadium is El Oroel with a capacity of 2,000 seats.

Season to season

14 seasons in Tercera División

External links
Futbolaragon.com profile 
atleticocalatayudcf.com profile

Football clubs in Aragon
Association football clubs established in 1960
Divisiones Regionales de Fútbol clubs
1960 establishments in Spain